Elena Simeonova Stoyanova (born January 23, 1952, in Krasen, Dobrich Province) is a retired track and field shot putter from Bulgaria, best known for competing at three consecutive Summer Olympics for her native country: 1972, 1976 and 1980. Her best Olympic results was finishing in sixth place at the 1980 Summer Olympics in Moscow, USSR, with a distance of 20.22 metres.

Achievements

References
sports-reference

1952 births
Living people
Bulgarian female shot putters
Athletes (track and field) at the 1972 Summer Olympics
Athletes (track and field) at the 1976 Summer Olympics
Athletes (track and field) at the 1980 Summer Olympics
Olympic athletes of Bulgaria
Universiade medalists in athletics (track and field)
Universiade silver medalists for Bulgaria
Medalists at the 1973 Summer Universiade
Medalists at the 1975 Summer Universiade
Medalists at the 1977 Summer Universiade
People from Dobrich Province
20th-century Bulgarian women
21st-century Bulgarian women